Egor Milovzorov (born November 19, 1987) is a Russian professional ice hockey forward who is currently an unrestricted free agent. He most recently played for hometown club, HC Sibir Novosibirsk in the Kontinental Hockey League (KHL).

He was acquired by HC Neftekhimik Nizhnekamsk from Yugra Khanty-Mansiysk for Anton Krysanov October 24, 2011.

External links

1987 births
Living people
Ak Bars Kazan players
Avtomobilist Yekaterinburg players
HC Dynamo Moscow players
HC Neftekhimik Nizhnekamsk players
Russian ice hockey forwards
HC Sibir Novosibirsk players
HC Yugra players
Sportspeople from Novosibirsk